Uruguay competed at the 1960 Summer Olympics in Rome, Italy. 34 competitors, all men, took part in 15 events in 8 sports.

Athletics

Fermín Donazar

Basketball

Preliminary Round (Group D)
 Lost to Spain (72-77)
 Defeated Poland (76-72)
 Defeated Philippines (80-76)
Semi Final Round (Group B)
 Lost to Soviet Union (53-89)
 Lost to United States (50-108)
 Lost to Yugoslavia (83-94)
Classification Round
 Lost to Czechoslovakia (72-98)
 Lost to Poland (62-64) → 8th place
Team Roster
Carlos Blixen
Danilo Coito
Héctor Costa
Nelson Chelle
Manuel Gadea
Adolfo Lubnicki
Sergio Matto
Raúl Mera
Washington Poyet
Waldemar Rial
Milton Scaron
Edison Ciavattone

Boxing

Gualberto Gutiérrez
Roberto Martínez
Pedro Votta

Cycling

Five cyclists, all male, represented Uruguay in 1960.

Individual road race
 Rubén Etchebarne
 Rodolfo Rodino
 Juan José Timón
 Alberto Velázquez

1000m time trial
 Luis Serra

Team pursuit
 Alberto Velázquez
 Juan José Timón
 Rubén Etchebarne
 Rodolfo Rodino

Equestrian

Carlos Colombino
Germán Mailhos
Rafael Paullier

Fencing

Two fencers represented Uruguay in 1960.

Men's foil
 Juan Paladino

Men's sabre
 Teodoro Goliardi
 Juan Paladino

Rowing

Uruguay had five male rowers participate in two out of seven rowing events in 1960.

 Men's double sculls
Paulo Carvalho
Mariano Caulín

 Men's coxed pair
Luis Aguiar
Gustavo Pérez
Raúl Torrieri (cox)

Sailing

Gonzalo García
Horacio García
Víctor Trinchin

References

External links
Montevideo.com
Official Olympic Reports

Nations at the 1960 Summer Olympics
1960
1960 in Uruguayan sport